How to Fail at Almost Everything and Still Win Big: Kind of the Story of My Life is a 2013 nonfiction book by Scott Adams, creator of Dilbert. Adams shares many of the techniques and theories from his life which he believes can increase a person's likelihood of success.

The book has been reviewed by Forbes India and the Dallas News.

See also
 Robert Cialdini

References

2013 non-fiction books
Self-help books
Books by Scott Adams
Portfolio (publisher) books